Chinese pickles or Chinese preserved vegetables consist of vegetables or fruits that have been fermented by pickling with salt and brine, or marinated in mixtures based on soy sauce or savory bean pastes. The former is usually done using high-fiber vegetables and fruits, such as Chinese cabbage, carrot, apple and pineapple, while the latter marinated group is made using a wide variety of vegetables, ranging from mustards and cucumbers to winter melon and radishes. As of now, there are more than 130 kinds of pickles.

History
Chinese pickles have a long history that dates back to 1100 B.C.E., during the Zhou dynasty. The word “pickle”, “tsu ('zi' in Pinyin)” in Chinese, means “salt and incubate”. The pickled vegetables and fruit we refer to today date in practice back to the sixth century B.C.E. Ancient people pickled mainly to preserve their vegetables and fruit because pickling preserves food far past the natural date of expiration. Foods would often be pickled during the harvest season for consumption during later parts of the year.

Flavor
Chinese pickles all need to balance the flavors of sweet, sour, pungent, salt, bitter and savory. There are also spicy pickles with floral notes, such as the Sichuan pepper. However, most Chinese pickles still aim for a balance between the tastes of vinegar, salt, garlic, ginger, soy sauce, hot chili, sugar, and the vegetable or fruit itself.
Most pickles need to wait for a few months for the vegetables and fruit to ferment, but there are also "quick pickles" which can be eaten a few hours or a few days after preparation. Cucumber pickles, for example, may be eaten after they have been pickled in a jar for three hours.

Consumption

Chinese pickle can be eaten directly from the jar as an appetizer, or used as an ingredient for cooking a larger dish. Before the meal, it is served with wine, beer, sodas, or tea to stimulate people's appetite. People eat the small dishes of Chinese pickles and some snacks to drink and chat. Chinese people can also eat pickles as a dish with steamed rice when they do not have many dishes. Chinese pickles are used as ingredients to cook the food as flavor base. Pickling ginger and pickling pepper are most frequently used ingredients to make Sichuan food. It can also help to flavor and enhance the vegetable, meat, poultry, and seafood. For example, Chinese cook duck soup with pickling radish to make the soup more delicious.

Fermented

Vegetables and plums are salted and allowed to ferment with the help of lactic acid bacteria. Depending on the desired product, the vegetable may also be fermented with Chinese wine and spices. Some types of these preserved vegetables are produced through being repeatedly dried after the fermentation.
Gongcai
Meigan cai
Suan cai
Tianjin preserved vegetable
Prunus mume
Zhacai
Ya cai 
Changzhou dried turnip (

Marinated
Vegetables are usually marinated in a soy sauce mixture with sugar, vinegar, salt, and additional spices. The vegetable are lightly boiled in the soy mixture before being left to cool and absorb the marinade:
Pao cai
Cucumbers
Radishes
Bitter melon
Garlic

Possible health hazards of pickled vegetables

The World Health Organization has listed pickled vegetables as a possible carcinogen, and the British Journal of Cancer released an online 2009 meta-analysis of research on pickles as increasing the risks of esophageal cancer. The report, citing limited data in a statistical meta analysis, indicates a potential two-fold increased risk of oesophageal cancer associated with Asian pickled vegetable consumption. Results from the research are described as having "high heterogeneity" and the study said that further well-designed prospective studies were warranted. However, their results stated "The majority of subgroup analyses showed a statistically significant association between consuming pickled vegetables and oesophageal squamous cell carcinoma".

The 2009 meta-analysis reported heavy infestation of pickled vegetables with fungi. Some common fungi can facilitate the formation of N-nitroso compounds, which are strong oesophageal carcinogens in several animal models. Roussin red methyl ester, a non-alkylating nitroso compound with tumour-promoting effect in vitro, was identified in pickles from Linxian in much higher concentrations than in samples from low-incidence areas. Fumonisin mycotoxins have been shown to cause liver and kidney tumours in rodents.

A 2017 study in Chinese Journal of Cancer  has linked salted vegetables (common among Chinese cuisine) to a fourfold increase in nasopharynx cancer, where fermentation was a critical step in creating nitrosamines, which some are confirmed carcinogens, as well as activation of Epstein–Barr virus by fermentation products.

See also

References